Brixworth Abbey was a monastic house in Northamptonshire, England.

The church, thought to have been of basilican plan, was devastated during the  Danish invasion of 876, and converted into All Saints' Church in the tenth century, when  the original western entrance was formed into  a tower.

References

Further reading

 

Monasteries in Northamptonshire
Anglo-Saxon monastic houses